Totland or Totland indre is a village in Stad Municipality in Vestland county, Norway. Totland village is the site of Totland Church.

On 1 January 2020, the Totland - Maurstad - Bryggja areas of the old Vågsøy Municipality were transferred to the newly created Stad Municipality.

References

Villages in Vestland
Stad, Norway